Thiago de Lima Silva (born November 1, 1983), commonly known as Thiago, is a Brazilian footballer who currently plays as a striker for FC Langenegg.

External links
 
 Austria Lustenau profile

1983 births
Living people
Brazilian footballers
SC Austria Lustenau players
Association football forwards